State of Mind is the second and final studio album released by Australian singer Holly Valance, released in Japan on 6 November 2003 by London Records. It is a mixture of dance and '80s electro-pop, some written by Valance herself. The album debuted on the Australian ARIA Albums Chart and the UK Albums Chart at the lower ends of the chart, making it her lowest-selling album (out of two) to date. The album's only single, the title track "State of Mind", was a top 20 hit in Australia, Finland and the United Kingdom.

The album's genre, electropop, differs slightly from Valance's previous album Footprints (2002), She stated, "It's kind of different 'cos at the time I was listening to rock, I was listening to dance and lots of electro and I loved them all equally. I thought[,] what would happen if we put them all in a pot and see what happens[? ...] the people I was working with at the time really like[d] that idea. So everyone was working on the same level with the same goals in mind. What we wanted to get out of it was a bit darker, a bit harder. It's a very kind of upbeat record and that's what I like to do."

State of Mind debuted on the ARIA Albums Chart at number 57 with sales of 1,600 copies on the issue dated 17 November 2003. The following week the album sold 998 copies falling to number eighty, leaving the chart the next week, spending a total of two weeks on the chart. The album debuted on the Japanese Oricon Albums Chart at number twelve with first-week sales of 21,547 copies. It the United Kingdom, the album peaked at number sixty.

The first and only single, title track "State of Mind", fared better, peaking at number eight in the United Kingdom and number fourteen in Australia.

"Desire" was set to be the second single from "State of Mind". The single was scheduled to be released in February 2004, but for unknown reasons, it was never released. Holly Valance later retired from music. In addition to the original version of "Desire," there is also a remix of the song by Manhattan Clique, which has also never been officially released.

Track listing
Credits adapted from the liner notes of State of Mind.

Notes
  signifies a co-producer

Charts

Sales

Release history

References

2003 albums
Albums produced by Mark Taylor (music producer)
Albums produced by Rick Nowels
Holly Valance albums
London Records albums